Hubert Védrine (born 31 July 1947) is a French Socialist politician. He is an advisor at Moelis & Company.

Early life and career 
Following a history degree and graduating from both Sciences Po and ENA, Védrine had toyed with the idea of entering journalism but, on the advice of the historian and family friend Jean Lacouture, instead took a post at the culture ministry.

Védrine was one of the longest-serving aides to a French President and worked closely with President François Mitterrand from 1981 to 1995. Védrine served first as Mitterrand's diplomatic advisor (the French equivalent of the National Security Advisor) from 1981 to 1988, then as Mitterrand's spokesperson from 1988 to 1991, and finally as Secretary-General of the French presidency (the equivalent of the White House Chief of Staff) from 1991 to 1995.

Védrine then served as Foreign Minister of France from 1997 to 2002 in the government of Lionel Jospin.

After the re-election of Jacques Chirac in May 2002, Védrine was replaced by Dominique de Villepin. All three men were characterised by their strong opposition to unilateral action by the United States in Iraq.

Védrine popularized the neologism hyperpower to describe what he saw as the historically-unparalleled influence and might that were held by the United States at the turn of the century.

Later career 
In 2003, Védrine founded Hubert Vedrine Conseil, a consulting firm.

In 2005, he was appointed by UN Secretary-General Kofi Annan, a member of the High Council for the Alliance of Civilizations, an initiative that seeks to galvanize international action against extremism through intercultural and interreligious dialogue and cooperation.

He took part in 2007 on the committee preparing the Paris Conference on the Environment to lay the foundations for a future United Nations Environment Organization.

Védrine is the author of more than 19 books, two of them having been translated in English by Philipp Gordon: France in an age of globalization, co-authored with Dominique Moisi (publisher: Brookings Institution Press, 2001) and History strikes back : how states, nations, and conflicts are shaping the twenty-first century (publisher: Brookings Institution Press, 2008), co-authored with Adrien Abecassis and Mohamed Bouabdallah.

Around the 2017 elections, news media reported that later President Emmanuel Macron sought regularly the advice of Védrine on foreign policy issues. In 2020, he was appointed by NATO Secretary General Jens Stoltenberg to join a group of experts to support his work in a reflection process to further strengthen NATO's political dimension.

Other activities

Corporate boards 
 Amundi, Chairman of the Global Advisory Board (since 2016)
 Moelis & Company, Member of the Global Advisory Board (since 2011)
 Richard Attias and Associates, Member of the International Advisory Board
 LVMH, Independent Member of the Board of Directors (since 2009)
 Ipsos, Independent Member of the Board of Directors (2009–2015)

Non-profit organizations 
 Rencontres d'Arles, Chairman of the Board of Directors
 Alliance of Civilizations, Member
 France China Foundation, Member of the Strategic Committee
 Paris School of International Affairs (PSIA), Member of the Strategic Committee
 Senior Network Member at the European Leadership Network (ELN)

Political positions 
In February 2020, Védrine joined around fifty former European prime ministers and foreign ministers in signing an open letter published by British newspaper The Guardian to condemn U.S. President Donald Trump's Middle East peace plan, saying it would create an apartheid-like situation in occupied Palestinian territory.

Recognition

References

External links 
Hubert Védrine official website 

1947 births
Living people
People from Creuse
Socialist Party (France) politicians
French Foreign Ministers
Directors of LVMH
Sciences Po alumni
École nationale d'administration alumni
Academic staff of Sciences Po